George Russell Stobbs (February 7, 1877 – December 23, 1966) was an attorney and politician.  A Republican.  He served as a member of the United States House of Representatives from Massachusetts for three terms.

Early life
Stobbs was born in Webster, Massachusetts on February 7, 1877, the son of Charles Richard Stobbs and Anna Lincoln. He attended the local schools of Webster, and graduated from Phillips Exeter Academy in 1895.  He received his bachelor's degree from Harvard University in 1899, and a master's degree from Harvard in 1900.  He received his law degree from Harvard Law School in 1902, was admitted to the bar, and commenced practice in Worcester, Massachusetts.

Military service
Stobbs commanded Company H, 20th Infantry Regiment of the Massachusetts State Guard from 1917 to 1920, and attained the rank of captain.  The State Guard was a volunteer organization which handled many of the in state responsibilities of the Massachusetts National Guard during the National Guard's overseas deployment for World War I.  From 1927 to 1942, Stobbs was a major and subsequently lieutenant colonel in the Judge Advocate General’s Department of the Officers Reserve Corps.

Political career
Stobbs served on Webster's school board from 1903 to 1906, and was active in Webster's Young Men's Republican Club, of which he served as president in 1904.  In 1908 he relocated to Worcester, where he practiced law in partnership with George S. Taft.  Stobbs was a special justice for the central district court of Worcester from 1909 to 1916, and assistant district attorney for the middle district of Massachusetts from 1917 to 1921.

In 1924, Stobbs was the successful Republican nominee for a seat in the United States House of Representatives; he was reelected twice, and served in the 69th, 70th, and 71st Congresses (March 4, 1925 - March 3, 1931).  He did not run for reelection in 1930.  During his House career, Stobbs was one of the managers appointed in 1926 to conduct impeachment proceedings against George W. English, the judge of the United States District Court for the Eastern District of Illinois.

In 1930, Stobbs was a U.S. delegate to the Inter-Parliamentary Union Congress in London.  He was delegate to the 1932 Republican National Convention, and to the Republican state conventions in 1940 and 1942.

Later career
After leaving Congress, Stobbs resumed practicing law in Worcester, Massachusetts and became the senior partner in the firm of Stobbs, Stockwell & Tilton.  He died in on December 23, 1966, and was buried at Worcester Rural Cemetery.

Family
In 1905, Stobbs was married to Mabel Florence Murdock (1875-1944).  Their children included sons Russell (1907-1975) and Hamilton (1910-1938).

References

Sources

Books

Newspapers

External links

1877 births
1966 deaths
Harvard Law School alumni
Politicians from Worcester, Massachusetts
District attorneys in Worcester County, Massachusetts
People from Webster, Massachusetts
Republican Party members of the United States House of Representatives from Massachusetts